The 1996 Utah gubernatorial election took place on November 5, 1996. Republican nominee and incumbent Governor Michael Leavitt won the election.

Democrat E. James Bradley, who had been elected as a Salt Lake County Commissioner in 1990 and lost re-election in 1994, announced his candidacy on March 18, 1996, the last day for candidates to file.  If he had not run, it was likely the Democratic party would not have had a candidate on the ballot.  In a poll released in early April 1996, Bradley trailed Leavitt by 63 points.   Leavitt, with high popularity ratings as the incumbent Governor, maintained a formidable lead in subsequent polls as well.

Leavitt and Bradley participated in a televised debate on October 26, 1996, at Brigham Young University.  Winning by the greatest margin in the state's history, Leavitt won every county.  Leavitt outspent Bradley four times over in his campaign, and raised over $650,000.

Minor additional candidates in this election included Independent Party candidate Dub Richards, Natural Law Party candidate Robert Lesh, and Ken Larsen of the Independent American Party.

Results

References

Gubernatorial
Utah
1996